Burn Hall School is an all boys missionary school in Srinagar, Jammu and Kashmir, India. Its motto is  "Industria Floremus - In Toil We Flourish" . It is one of the oldest schools in the valley. The school celebrated its Diamond Jubilee in 2016.

History

Mill Hill missionaries Fr. Thijssen and Fr. Jong started a boys' school in Srinagar in 1942. "The Willows" building which housed the first Burn Hall School is now the Teachers' Training College.

The Srinagar branch closed down temporarily following the tribal invasion that occurred during the Indo-Pakistani War of 1947–1948, and it was restarted on 17 April 1956 with its first principal, Father J. Boerkamp.

Location

Burn Hall School is located in Sonwar, Srinagar. It is neighboured by Ziarat Sharief of Syed Yaqoob Sahib, and Sher-i-Kashmir Stadium.

Administration

Burn Hall School is managed by the Roman Catholic Diocese of Jammu–Srinagar. It is directed by the Education Society of the Jammu-Srinagar Diocese. The school serves children from age 3 years through secondary school.

Social status

According to Greater Kashmir, in 2015 District Development Commissioner Farooq Ahmed Shah praised Burn Hall for "spreading quality education". Kashmir Observer said it is "a prestigious institution in the city, with one of the oldest schooling traditions". Yet Greater Kashmir also reported, in an article about matriculation exam results, "While the old famed brands like Tyndale Biscoe School, Presentation Convent Higher Secondary School and Burn Hall may still be first choice for schooling in this summer capital, other private schools including new ones seem to be emerging more meritorious, at least on the academic front."

In 2017, former Education Minister Altaf Bukhari congratulated the Principal, Father Sebastian Nagathunkal, for inaugurating a debate program at the school.

Affiliations

Registered as a charitable society, it is affiliated with Jammu and Kashmir State Board of School Education (JKBOSE) and recognized by the Education Department of the Government of Jammu and Kashmir. It follows the directions from the Directorate of School Education, Srinagar.

Public empowerment liability

The school's lease agreement on government land requires the school to hold places to admit students from the low economic sector of society.

Curriculum 
Burn Hall School follows curriculum of the JKBOSE, and as an English medium school, it places special emphasis on usage of English language in student-teacher and student-student interaction. Extra-curricular cultural and literary activities, as well as environment and science activities, provide experiential learning opportunities.

Notable alumni  
 
 Omar Abdullah - Politician
 Agha Shahid Ali - English poet
 Rohit Bal - Fashion designer
 Haseeb Drabu - Economist, politician
 Zain Khan Durrani - Bollywood actor
 Mirwaiz Umar Farooq - Politician 
 MC Kash - Rap / Hip hop artist
 Autar Kaw - Academic 
 Amjad Khan - Cricketer
 Sajjad Gani Lone - Politician 
 Amitabh Mattoo - Educationist, policy maker
 Junaid Azim Mattu - Srinagar mayor / Politician 
 Tanvir Sadiq - Politician 
 Sanjay Suri - Bollywood actor

Former principals
 19561962: Fr. Boerkamp MHM
 19631964: Fr. Kuipers MHM
 19641967: Fr. J. Mc Mohan MHM
 19681977: Fr. J. Jones MHM
 19771983: Fr. J.C. Hugh OFM Cap.
 19841989: Fr. Dominic OFM Cap.
 19901992: Br. V. J. Mani SG
 19921993: Br. Raju John SG
 19931997: Br. Jacob SG
 19972001: Br. George SG
 20012007: Fr. Maria John
 20072012: Fr. Raphael Jey Kumar
 20122014: Fr. Ivan Pereira
 20153 Nov 2021: Fr. Sebastian Nagathunkal
 3 Nov 2021present: Fr. Stalin Raja

See also 
 List of schools in India
 Green Valley Educational Institute
 Delhi Public School, Srinagar
 List of Christian Schools in India
 St. Joseph's School Baramulla

References

External links 

 Facebook page

Schools in Jammu and Kashmir
Schools in Srinagar
1942 establishments in India
Private schools in India
Private schools in Jammu and Kashmir
Catholic schools in India
Christian schools in India
Christian schools in Jammu and Kashmir
Educational institutions established in 1942